Biederitz-Möser was a Verwaltungsgemeinschaft ("collective municipality") in the Jerichower Land district, in Saxony-Anhalt, Germany. It was situated east of Magdeburg. The seat of the Verwaltungsgemeinschaft was in Möser. It was disbanded on 1 January 2010.

The Verwaltungsgemeinschaft Biederitz-Möser consisted of the following municipalities:

 Biederitz 
 Gerwisch 
 Gübs 
 Hohenwarthe 
 Königsborn 
 Körbelitz 
 Lostau
 Möser
 Pietzpuhl 
 Schermen 
 Woltersdorf

References

Former Verwaltungsgemeinschaften in Saxony-Anhalt